Aliansa – Aerolineas Andinas is a Colombian airline based at Vanguardia Airport. The airline was founded by Jorge Álvarez and his family on August 29, 1989, and commenced operations in 1995. Aliansa operates cargo, and passenger charter flights, mainly from Vanguardia Airport, and to the Amazon and eastern plains regions of Colombia. The airline serves approximately 95 percent of airports in Colombia.

Fleet 
The following consists of the fleet of Aliansa – Aerolineas Andinas as of August 2020.

Accidents and incidents 
On Wednesday, November 10, 1999, an Aliansa DC-3 with the registration of HK-2581 on a cargo flight departed Putumayo Airport at 6:40 hours local time. The flight to Villaviencio proceeded normally until 11,500 feet, when the crew made their last call to ATC. At that point, the plane had been declared missing. The plane was found, and it had crashed in the area of La Montañita. It was determined the plane broke up in mid air because the wreckage of the plane was spread out over the span of 7.2 km.
On Thursday, March 18, 1999, an Aliansa DC-3 with the registration of HK-337, took off from Cúcuta-Camilo Daza Airport for a domestic flight to El Yopal. On board were three crew members and five passengers. The cargo on the flight weighed approximately 2500 kg. The crew filed a VFR flight plan with a cruising altitude of 11500 feet. The DC-3C took off at 15:33 hours local time. The aircraft failed to arrive at El Yopal, and a search mission was launched. The aircraft remained missing for 23 days. Finally, on April 12, 1999, the aircraft was located on the Radial 287 from Tame Airport, at 24.2 nautical miles. The wreckage distribution and the evidence of the intact shrubbery near the crash site pointing to the probable cause of the crash being a stall. There was extreme turbulence, and this is what most likely caused the plane to stall.
On Thursday, May 8, 2014, an Aliansa Airlines DC-3 with the registration of HK-4700, was on a non-scheduled cargo flight from Villavicencio to Florencia. The weight of the cargo on board was 2,540 kg. They took off at 11:15 hours local time, and the visibility was decreasing, making it near impossible to fly visually. The plane changed its course to avoid clouds and turbulence, but flew over more mountainous and large terrain. This led the plane to impact the forested side of a mountain at 6,500 feet. The aircraft was damaged beyond recognition.
On Sunday, February 28, 2021, an Aliansa Airlines DC-3 with the registration of HK-2006, performing a flight from Mitu to Monfort Vaupeson with 3 crew, suffered an accident while landing at Monfort. There were no injuries, the aircraft received substantial damage however.
On Thursday, July 8, 2021, an Aliansa Airlines DC-3 with the registration of HK-2820, was on a training flight originating at Villavicencio with three crew members on board crashed while flying over Guatiquia, killing everyone on board.

References

External links

Airlines established in 1989
Airlines of Colombia
Companies of Colombia